The Evans Manufacturing Company Building, also known as Metropolitan Supply Company Building, is a historic building located in Cedar Rapids, Iowa, United States.  The Brown-Evans Manufacturing Company, which made men's work clothing, was relocated  from Sedalia, Missouri to Cedar Rapids when this building was completed in 1919. It was built in the 4th Street Railroad Corridor, which had attracted various industrial enterprises in the years before and after World War I.  The Modern Movement building was designed according to the principles of industrial design of the time in light of the Triangle Shirtwaist Factory fire in 1911.  Its fireproof masonry construction was intended to lessen the risk of fires.  Storage of raw stock was located in the basement, cutting and storage of finished stock was located on the first floor, and sewing was done on the second floor and balcony.  Its open floor plan allowed for assembly line production.

The company reorganized in 1933 as the Evans Garment Company, and it expanded to producing women's house dresses the following year.  As the Great Depression wore on, their market declined and the plant closed three years later.  It was replaced by the Metropolitan Supply Company, who moved their printing and school supply operation here in 1936.  They moved to a different facility in 1995, and closed a short time later.  This building then housed an architectural office, a dance studio, and a warehouse operation.  It was listed on the National Register of Historic Places in 1999.

References

Industrial buildings completed in 1919
Modernist architecture in Iowa
Buildings and structures in Cedar Rapids, Iowa
National Register of Historic Places in Cedar Rapids, Iowa
Industrial buildings and structures on the National Register of Historic Places in Iowa